Dalecarlia or Dalarna is a historical province in Sweden.

It can also refer to the following geographic locations:

 Dalälven or Dalecarlia River, in Sweden
 Dalecarlia Reservoir, in Washington DC, United States
 Dalecarlia Tunnel, in Washington DC, United States
 Lake Dalecarlia, Indiana, census-designated place in United States

Other 
The following articles associated with the province of Dalecarlia:
 Dalecarlian dialects
 Dalecarlian horse,  a traditional carved, painted wooden horse statuette
 Dalecarlian Rebellion (1743)
 Dalecarlian runes, a late version of the runic script that was in use in the Swedish province of Dalarna until the 20th century
 Dalecarlians (film) or Masjävlar, a 2004 Swedish film
 Duke of Dalecarlia, a Swedish title